The 1964–65 season was Liverpool Football Club's 73rd season in existence and their third consecutive season in the First Division. The club won its first FA Cup thanks to a 2–1 extra time victory against Leeds United in the final. The club's first final for 15 years saved a season in which Liverpool slipped from first to seventh in the league, and controversially collapsed at the hands of Inter in the European Cup semi-finals, in the club's first season in European competition.

Liverpool experimented with red shirts, shorts and socks during this season. The all red strip was used only in a number of European Cup and FA Cup matches, with League matches played in white shorts. The club permanently switched to a full red strip at the start of the 1965-66 season.

Squad

Goalkeepers
  Tommy Lawrence
  William Molyneux

Defenders
  Gerry Byrne
  Phil Ferns
  Alan Hignett
  Chris Lawler
  Thomas Lowry
  Ronnie Moran
  Tommy Smith
  Bobby Thomson
  Ron Yeats

Midfielders
  Alan A'Court
  Ian Callaghan
  Kevin Lewis
  Jimmy Melia
  Gordon Milne
  John Sealey
  Willie Stevenson
  Gordon Wallace
  Johnny Wheeler
  Peter Thompson

Attackers
  Alf Arrowsmith
  Phil Chisnall
  Bobby Graham
  Roger Hunt
  John Sealey
  Ian St. John
  Geoff Strong

League table

Results

First Division

FA Charity Shield

FA Cup

Final

European Cup

References

 LFC History.net – 1964-65 season
 Liverweb - 1964-65 Season

Liverpool F.C. seasons
Liverpool